Ctenocladaceae is a family of green algae in the order Ulvales.

References

External links

Ulvophyceae families
Ulvales